Emanuel Labhardt (11 March 1810, Steckborn - 10 June 1874, Feuerthalen) was a Swiss landscape painter, graphic artist and lithographer.

Life and work 
From 1827, he was an apprentice for drawing, painting, etching and lithography in the studios of Johann Heinrich Bleuler, the Younger (1787–1857) in Feuerthalen; under the supervision of Johann Heinrich Wirz (1784-1866). In 1832, he married Wirz's daughter Caroline.

The following year, he went to work for Bleuler's brother, Johann Ludwig, who had an art school and publishing firm at Laufen Castle. During his time there, under commission from his employer, he took several study trips to Bodensee, Central Switzerland and other European countries. 

In 1837, he founded his own lithographic company in Feuerthalen. Caroline died from giving birth to their sixth child. He eventually married her youngest sister, Else, with whom he had nine more children. During the Sonderbund War, he served as a Captain.

During his professional life, he mastered various other painting and printing techniques, such as watercolors, gouache, copper etching and aquatints. Of particular note is his 1866 publication, Album von Schaffhausen. 

He died in 1874, after a brief, but serious illness.

Sources 
 
 Manfred Weigele: Emanuel Labhardt, Landschaftsmaler aus Steckborn. Museum im Turmhof, Steckborn 2010,  (Exhibition catalog). (Online).

External links 

 More works by Labhardt @ ArtNet

1810 births
1874 deaths
Swiss painters
Swiss lithographers
People from Frauenfeld District